Generally Accepted Accounting Principles (GAAP or U.S. GAAP, pronounced like "gap") is the accounting standard adopted by the U.S. Securities and Exchange Commission (SEC) and is the default accounting standard used by companies based in the United States.

The Financial Accounting Standards Board (FASB) publishes and maintains the Accounting Standards Codification (ASC), which is the single source of authoritative nongovernmental U.S. GAAP. The FASB published U.S. GAAP in Extensible Business Reporting Language (XBRL) beginning in 2008.

Sources of GAAP
The FASB Accounting Standards Codification is the source of authoritative GAAP recognized by the FASB to be applied by nongovernmental entities. Rules and interpretive releases of the SEC under authority of federal securities laws are also sources of authoritative GAAP for SEC registrants. In addition to the SEC's rules and interpretive releases, the SEC staff issues Staff Accounting Bulletins that represent practices followed by the staff in administering SEC disclosure requirements, and it utilizes SEC Staff Announcements and Observer comments made at Emerging Issues Task Force meetings to publicly announce its views on certain accounting issues for SEC registrants.

Examples of nonauthoritative accounting guidance and literature include the following:
 Practices that are widely recognized and prevalent either generally or in the industry
 FASB Concepts Statements
 American Institute of Certified Public Accountants (AICPA) Issues Papers
 International Financial Reporting Standards of the International Accounting Standards Board
 Pronouncements of professional associations or regulatory agencies
 Technical Information Service Inquiries and Replies included in AICPA Technical Practice Aids
 Accounting textbooks, handbooks, and articles.

The FASB issues an Accounting Standards Update (Update or ASU) to communicate changes to the FASB Codification, including changes to non-authoritative SEC content. ASUs are not authoritative standards. Each ASU explains:
 How the FASB has changed U.S. GAAP, including each specific amendment to the FASB Codification
 Why the FASB decided to change U.S. GAAP and background information related to the change
 When the changes will be effective and the transition method.

Basic concepts

To achieve basic objectives and implement fundamental qualities, GAAP has four basic assumptions, four basic principles, and four basic constraints.

Assumptions
 Business Entity: assumes that the business is separate from its owners or other businesses. Revenue and expense should be kept separate from personal expenses.
 Going Concern: assumes that the business will be in operation indefinitely.  This validates the methods of asset capitalization, depreciation, and amortization. Only when liquidation is certain this assumption is not applicable. The business will continue to exist in the unforeseeable future. 
 Monetary Unit principle: assumes a stable currency is going to be the unit of record. The FASB accepts the nominal value of the US Dollar as the monetary unit of record unadjusted for inflation.
 Time-period principle: implies that the economic activities of an enterprise can be divided into artificial time periods.

Principles
 Historical cost principle: requires companies to account and report assets and liabilities acquisition costs rather than fair market value. This principle provides information that is reliable (removing opportunity to provide subjective and potentially biased market values), but not very relevant. Thus there is a trend to use fair values. Most debts and securities are now reported at market values.
 Revenue recognition principle: holds that companies should record revenue when earned but not when received. The flow of cash does not have any bearing on the recognition of revenue. This is the essence of accrual basis accounting. Conversely, however, losses must be recognized when their occurrence becomes probable, whether or not it has actually occurred. This comports with the constraint of conservatism, yet brings it into conflict with the constraint of consistency, in that reflecting revenues/gains is inconsistent with the way in which losses are reflected.
 Matching principle: expenses have to be matched with revenues as long as it is reasonable to do so. Expenses are recognized not when the work is performed, or when a product is produced, but when the work or the product actually makes its contribution to revenue. Only if no connection with revenue can be established, cost may be charged as expenses to the current period (e.g., office salaries and other administrative expenses). This principle allows greater evaluation of actual profitability and performance (shows how much was spent to earn revenue). Depreciation and Cost of Goods Sold are good examples of application of this principle.
 Full disclosure principle: Amount and kinds of information disclosed should be decided based on trade-off analysis as a larger amount of information costs more to prepare and use. Information disclosed should be enough to make a judgment while keeping costs reasonable. Information is presented in the main body of financial statements, in the notes or as supplementary information

Constraints
 Objectivity principle: The company financial statements provided by the accountants should be based on objective evidence.
 Materiality principle: The significance of an item should be considered when it is reported. An item is considered significant when it would affect the decision of a reasonable individual. 
 Consistency principle: The company uses the same accounting principles and methods from period to period.
 Conservatism principle: When choosing between two solutions, the one which has the less favorable outcome is the solution which should be chosen (see convention of conservatism)
 Cost Constraint: The benefits of reporting financial information should justify and be greater than the costs imposed on supplying it.

Required departures from GAAP

Under the AICPA's Code of Professional Ethics under Rule 203 – Accounting Principles, a member must depart from GAAP if following it would lead to a material misstatement on the financial statements, or otherwise be misleading. In the departure, the member must disclose, if practical, the reasons why compliance with the accounting principle would result in a misleading financial statement. Under Rule 203-1 – Departures from Established Accounting Principles, the departures are rare, and usually take place when there is new legislation, the evolution of new forms of business transactions, an unusual degree of materiality, or the existence of conflicting industry practices.

History
Accounting standards are currently set by the Financial Accounting Standards Board and were historically set by the American Institute of Certified Public Accountants (AICPA) subject to U.S. Securities and Exchange Commission (SEC) regulations. Auditors took the leading role in developing GAAP for business enterprises.

Standard Setting Prior to the Creation of the FASB
The United States Securities and Exchange Commission (SEC) was created as a result of the Great Depression. At that time there was no organization setting accounting standards. The SEC encouraged the establishment of private standard-setting bodies through the AICPA and later the FASB, believing that the private sector had the proper knowledge, resources, and talents. Currently, the SEC works closely with various private organizations setting GAAP, but does not set GAAP itself.

In 1939, urged by the SEC, the American Institute of Certified Public Accountants (AICPA) appointed the Committee on Accounting Procedure (CAP). During 1939 to 1959 CAP issued 51 Accounting Research Bulletins that dealt with a variety of timely accounting problems. However, this problem-by-problem approach failed to develop the much needed structured body of accounting principles. Thus, in 1959, the AICPA created the Accounting Principles Board (APB), whose mission it was to develop an overall conceptual framework. It issued 31 opinions until it was dissolved in 1973.

Realizing the need to reform the APB, leaders in the accounting profession appointed a Study Group on the Establishment of Accounting Principles (commonly known as the Wheat Committee for its chairman Francis Wheat). This group determined that the APB must be dissolved and a new standard-setting structure created.

Financial Accounting Standards Board (FASB)
In 1973, the APB was replaced by the Financial Accounting Standards Board (FASB) under the supervision of the Financial Accounting Foundation with the Financial Accounting Standards Advisory Council serving to advise and provide input on the accounting standards.

After the creation of the FASB, the AICPA established the Accounting Standards Executive Committee (AcSEC). It publishes:
Audit and Accounting Guidelines, which summarizes the accounting practices of specific industries (e.g. casinos, colleges, and airlines) and provides specific guidance on matters not addressed by FASB or GASB.
Statements of Position, which provides guidance on financial reporting topics until the FASB or GASB sets standards on the issue.
Practice Bulletins, which indicate the AcSEC's views on narrow financial reporting issues not considered by the FASB or the GASB.

In 1984, the FASB created the Emerging Issues Task Force (EITF). The mission of the EITF is to "assist the FASB in improving financial reporting through the timely identification, discussion, and resolution of financial accounting issues within the framework of the FASB Accounting Standards Codification."

The FASB currently publishes the following:
 Accounting Standards Codification, the only source of authoritative nongovernmental U.S. GAAP. In 2009, the Codification superseded the FASB's Statements of Financial Accounting Standards. 168 standards had been issued before the Codification.
 Concepts Statements, first issued in 1978. They are part of the FASB's conceptual framework project and set forth fundamental objectives and concepts that the FASB use in developing future standards. As they are not part of the Codification, they are not authoritative GAAP. There have been 8 concepts published to date, of which 5 have been superseded.
 Technical Bulletins or Staff Positions, guidelines on applying standards, interpretations, and opinions. Usually solve some very specific accounting issue that will not have a significant, lasting effect or respond to questions from practitioners.
 Accounting Standards Updates (ASU), where the FASB issues an ASU to communicate changes to the FASB Codification, including changes to non-authoritative SEC content.
 Exposure Documents, where the FASB issues Exposure Documents to solicit an ASU to communicate changes to the FASB Codification, including changes to non-authoritative SEC content.

Codification in Accounting – FASB Accounting Standards Codification
Circa 2008, the FASB issued the FASB Accounting Standards Codification, which reorganized the thousands of U.S. GAAP pronouncements into roughly 90 accounting topics.

The Codification is effective for interim and annual periods ending after September 15, 2009. All existing accounting standards documents are superseded as described in FASB Statement No. 168, The FASB Accounting Standards Codification and the Hierarchy of Generally Accepted Accounting Principles. All other accounting literature not included in the Codification is non-authoritative.

The Codification reorganizes the thousands of U.S. GAAP pronouncements into roughly 90 accounting topics and displays all topics using a consistent structure. It also includes relevant Securities and Exchange Commission (SEC), guidance that follows the same topical structure in separate sections in the Codification.

To prepare users for the change, the AICPA has provided a number of tools and training resources.

While the Codification does not change GAAP, it introduces a new structure—one that is organized in an easily accessible, user-friendly online research system. The FASB expects that the new system will reduce the amount of time and effort required to research an accounting issue, mitigate the risk of noncompliance with standards through improved usability of the literature, provide accurate information with real-time updates as new standards are released, and assist the FASB with the research efforts required during the standard-setting process.

Other Organizations
Other organizations involved in determining United States accounting standards include:
 Governmental Accounting Standards Board (GASB). Created in 1984, the GASB addresses state and local government reporting issues. Its structure is similar to that of the FASB's, and the FASB and GASB are located together and share resources.
 Federal Accounting Standards Advisory Board (FASAB). Created in 1990, the FASAB addresses federal government financial reporting issues. The FASAB issues federal financial accounting standards and provides guidance to federal reporting entities.

Other influential organizations include the Government Finance Officer's Association (GFOA), American Accounting Association, Institute of Management Accountants, and Financial Executives Institute.

Convergence with International Financial Reporting Standards

In 2006, the FASB began working with the International Accounting Standards Board (IASB) to reduce or eliminate the differences between U.S. GAAP and the International Financial Reporting Standards (IFRS), known as the IASB-FASB convergence project. The scope of the overall IASB-FASB convergence project has evolved over time. The IASB and FASB issued converged standards for accounting topics including Business combinations (2008), Consolidation (2011), Fair value measurement (2011), and Revenue recognition (2014). Other convergence projects have been discontinued. As of 2022, the convergence project is coming to an end and no new projects will be added to the agenda.

In 2008, the Securities and Exchange Commission issued a preliminary "roadmap" that indicated it was considering whether to adopt or allow domestic issuers to use IFRS instead of U.S. GAAP. In 2010, the SEC expressed their aim to fully adopt International Financial Reporting Standards in the U.S. by 2014. However, standards under IFRS differ considerably from U.S. GAAP, so progress was slow and uncertain. More recently, the SEC has acknowledged that there is no longer a push to move more U.S companies to IFRS, so the two sets of standards will "continue to coexist" for the foreseeable future.

See also

Accounting standard
Fin 48
International Financial Reporting Standards
Other comprehensive basis of accounting
Philosophy of accounting
Statutory accounting principles for U.S. insurance companies

Notes

External links

SEC Accounting Bulletins – United States
SEC Division of Corporate Finance – United States
Financial Accounting Standards Board Website (FASB) – United States
Government Accounting Standards Board Website (GASB) – United States
US GAAP XBRL Taxonomy – United States

U.S. Securities and Exchange Commission

es:Principios de Contabilidad Generalmente Aceptados
he:עקרונות חשבונאיים מקובלים